Plectrurus aureus, commonly known as the Kerala burrowing snake or Kerala shieldtail, is a species of uropeltid snake endemic to India.

Geographic range
It is found in southwestern India in the Western Ghats.

Type locality: "Chambra mountain in Wynad, near Kalpatty - one under an old rotten log at 6,000 feet elevation, the other under a large stone at 4,500 feet, both in heavy evergreen forest".

Description
Dorsum gold-colored, the scales edged with violet; a few irregular narrow violet-black crossbars may be present. Ventrum brighter gold-colored, with violet-black crossbands or alternating spots.

Ventrals 164–177; subcaudals 8–12.

Scalation very similar to Plectrurus guentheri, except the ventrals are two times as broad as the contiguous scales. Diameter of body 39 to 44 times in the total length.

Footnotes

Further reading

 Beddome, R.H. 1880. Description of a new Snake of the Genus Plectrurus from Malabar. Proc. Zool. Soc. London, 1880: 182.
 Beddome, R.H. 1886. An Account of the Earth-Snakes of the Peninsula of India and Ceylon. Ann. Mag. Nat. Hist. (5) 17: 3-33.

External links
 

Uropeltidae
Reptiles of India
Reptiles described in 1880